This list of botanical gardens and arboretums in Massachusetts is intended to include all significant botanical gardens and arboretums in the U.S. state of Massachusetts

See also
List of botanical gardens and arboretums in the United States

References 

 
 
Tourist attractions in Massachusetts
botanical gardens and arboretums in Massachusetts